Otterburn Park is a small town located 40 km east of Montreal, Quebec, Canada. The population as of the Canada 2011 Census was 8,450. The town lies south of Mont-Saint-Hilaire on the Richelieu River and is one of the few officially bilingual towns in Quebec.

History
Originally a rural agricultural area, Otterburn Park's transformation began in the late 1800s, when it became a favourite weekend destination for employees of the Grand Trunk Railway, which, starting in 1885, ran a weekend train from Bonaventure Station to Mont-Saint-Hilaire.  Occasional recreational visitors, including railroad employees, bought or built summer cottages, spurring development and, eventually, permanent settlement.

Until 1949, the Otterburn park was a neighbourhood within Mont-Saint-Hilaire parish.  It took its present name, Otterburn Park, by vote in 1953.

Otterburn Park was the scene of the St-Hilaire train disaster in 1864, in which nearly 100 people were killed when an immigrant train failed to stop at an open swing bridge and fell into the Richelieu.  The disaster remains the worst railroad accident in Canadian history, and the bridge is known to this day as the Pont Noir, or black bridge.

Demographics 

Population trend:

Mother tongue language (2006)

Education

The South Shore Protestant Regional School Board previously served the municipality.

See also
List of cities in Quebec

References

External links
City of Otterburn Park

Cities and towns in Quebec
Incorporated places in La Vallée-du-Richelieu Regional County Municipality
Greater Montreal
Bilingual cities and towns in Quebec